Laëtitia Milot (born 5 July 1980) is a French actress, singer and author.

Filmography

Discography

Theater

Clip

Author

Advertising

Other 
In 2013, she was one of the contestants during the Fourth season of Danse avec les stars. She finished in third place.

References

External links

1980 births
Living people
French television actresses
French film actresses
French stage actresses
21st-century French actresses
People from Limoges